An abandoned graveyard is a burial ground that has ceased to operate because the county assessor is unable to determine ownership, or because the organization established for the burial of deceased persons has been diffused or departmentally terminated by the secretary of state, or for some other reason where ownership has not been transferred, or because the graveyard no longer has a valid certificate of authority to operate as determined by the board of graveyard and funeral commissioners. Simply put, a cemetery that has ceased to be taken care of by officials and no longer recognized officially as a cemetery.

Exploration
Abandoned graveyards are popular visiting spots for urban exploration enthusiasts.

See also
Abandoned mine
Abandoned railway
Abandoned amusement park
Abandoned vehicle

References

Urban decay
Cemeteries